Thirumaignanam is a village in the Kumbakonam taluk of Thanjavur district, Tamil Nadu, India.

Demographics 

As per the 2001 census, Thirumaignanam had a population of 895 with 451 males and 444 females. The sex ratio was 984. The literacy rate was 89.57%.

References 

 

Villages in Thanjavur district